Lobakin is a rural locality (a khutor) and the administrative center of Lobakinskoye Rural Settlement, Surovikinsky District, Volgograd Oblast, Russia. The population was 1,022 as of 2010. There are 22 streets.

Geography 
Lobakin is located near the Dobraya River, 28 km north of Surovikino (the district's administrative centre) by road. Dobrinka is the nearest rural locality.

References 

Rural localities in Surovikinsky District